Presidential elections were held in Kyrgyzstan on 29 October 2000. The result was a victory for incumbent President Askar Akayev, who was re-elected with over 70% of the vote. International election monitors described the vote as failing to meet international standards. Voter turnout was 78.4%.

Results

References

Presidential elections in Kyrgyzstan
Kyrgyzstan
2000 in Kyrgyzstan